Jamar Kentrell  Walker (born 1986) is an American lawyer serving as a United States district judge of the United States District Court for the Eastern District of Virginia. He previously served as an assistant United States attorney for the United States Attorney’s Office for the Eastern District of Virginia.

Early life and education 
Walker was born and raised on the Eastern Shore of Virginia. He attended Nandua High School and served as class president. He earned a Bachelor of Arts degree from the University of Virginia in 2008 and a Juris Doctor from the University of Virginia School of Law in 2011.

Career 
In 2011 and 2012, Walker served as a law clerk for Judge Raymond Alvin Jackson of the United States District Court for the Eastern District of Virginia. From 2012 to 2015, he worked as an associate at Covington & Burling in Washington, D.C. He has served as an assistant United States attorney in the United States Attorney's Office for the Eastern District of Virginia from 2015 to 2023, where he has focused on white collar crime.

Federal judicial service 

In March 2022, Walker was one of two candidates recommended to the president by U.S. Senators Mark Warner and Tim Kaine. On July 13, 2022, President Joe Biden nominated Walker to serve as a United States district judge of the United States District Court for the Eastern District of Virginia. President Biden nominated Walker to the seat vacated by Judge Raymond Alvin Jackson, who assumed senior status on November 23, 2021. On September 21, 2022, a hearing on his nomination was held before the Senate Judiciary Committee. On December 1, 2022, his nomination was reported out of committee by a 15–7 vote. On January 3, 2023, his nomination was returned to the President under Rule XXXI, Paragraph 6 of the United States Senate; he was renominated later the same day. On February 2, 2023, his nomination was reported out of committee by a 14–6 vote. On February 27, 2023, the Senate invoked cloture on his nomination by a 52–39 vote. On February 28, 2023, his nomination was confirmed by a 52–41 vote. He received his judicial commission on March 3, 2023. Walker is the first openly LGBTQ Article III judge to serve in Virginia.

See also 
 List of African-American federal judges
 List of African-American jurists
 List of LGBT jurists in the United States

References

External links 

1986 births
Living people
21st-century American judges
21st-century American lawyers
African-American judges
African-American lawyers
Assistant United States Attorneys
Judges of the United States District Court for the Eastern District of Virginia
LGBT judges
LGBT lawyers
People associated with Covington & Burling
People from Nassawadox, Virginia
United States district court judges appointed by Joe Biden
University of Virginia alumni
University of Virginia School of Law alumni
Virginia lawyers